Bab el Bhar ("the sea gate"), also known as  (the gate of France), is a city gate in Tunis, the capital of Tunisia. It marks the separation between the Medina of Tunis and the modern city. The gate is made up of a lowered archway and topped by a crenellated parapet.

References

External links

Bhar